The Ritter Observatory is an astronomical observatory owned and operated by the University of Toledo (UT) in Toledo, Ohio. Ritter Planetarium is located in the same building, and the university also operates Brooks Observatory in an adjacent building. Ritter Observatory features a  Ritchey-Chrétien telescope built in 1967 by Warner & Swasey Company of Cleveland, Ohio. It was installed in 1968, and is used primarily for spectroscopy and occasionally for instruction and public viewing events.  Research conducted at the observatory focuses on long-term spectroscopic monitoring of stars such as Rigel, Beta Lyrae, and Zeta Tauri.

See also
 Brooks Observatory
 List of astronomical observatories

References

External links
 Ritter Observatory at the University of Toledo
 Ritter Observatory Clear Sky Chart Forecasts of observing conditions.

Astronomical observatories in Ohio
Buildings and structures in Toledo, Ohio
University of Toledo